The 1953 All-Ireland Junior Hurling Championship was the 32nd staging of the All-Ireland Junior Championship since its establishment by the Gaelic Athletic Association in 1912.

Dublin entered the championship as the defending champions.

The All-Ireland final was played on 11 October 1953 at Thurles Sportsfield, between Tipperary and Warwickshire, in what was their first meeting in a final. Tipperary won the match by 4-10 to 3-03 to claim their seventh championship title overall and a first title since 1933.

Results

All-Ireland Junior Hurling Championship

All-Ireland semi-finals

All-Ireland home final

All-Ireland final

References

Junior
All-Ireland Junior Hurling Championship